Jill Billings (born January 19, 1962) is a former teacher, former member of the La Crosse County board of supervisors, and Democratic member of the Wisconsin State Assembly, first elected to represent the 95th district in a 2011 special election. She represents the City of La Crosse and portions of the Towns of Shelby and Campbell.

Background
Billings was born in Stewartville, Minnesota; both of her grandfathers had been candidates for mayor. She studied communication and English at Augsburg College, before moving to La Crosse in 1990. She spent seven years as a teacher of English and citizenship to Hmong immigrants.

She worked on La Crosse County's land use plan, helped established a special rehabilitation court for persons convicted of driving while intoxicated, and worked on the county’s Economic Development Fund. Between 2004 and 2012, she was a member of the La Crosse County board of supervisors, becoming vice chair of the County Health and Human Services Board and head of the Family Policy Board Executive Committee.

Legislative race
On November 8, 2011, Billings was elected to the Wisconsin State Assembly in a special election in the 95th Assembly District (the city of La Crosse and portions of the towns of Campbell and Shelby), succeeding fellow Democrat Jennifer Shilling, who replaced Senator Dan Kapanke in the Wisconsin State Senate following a successful recall election against him. Billings took 72.6% of the vote against Republican David Drewes, a small government advocate and supporter of Governor Scott Walker. The district has elected Democrats to the Assembly consistently since 1974.

Personal life
As of her election, she was 49, and separated. She has two children, Josh and Zoe, ages 18 and 16.

References

External links
Wisconsin Assembly - Representative Jill Billings official government website
Billings for Assembly official campaign website

1962 births
County supervisors in Wisconsin
Teachers of English as a second or foreign language
Living people
Democratic Party members of the Wisconsin State Assembly
Augsburg University alumni
People from Stewartville, Minnesota
Politicians from La Crosse, Wisconsin
Educators from Wisconsin
American women educators
Women state legislators in Wisconsin
21st-century American politicians
21st-century American women politicians
Educators from Minnesota